Karel Komárek (born 15 March 1969) is a Czech businessman worth $8.18 billion as of February 2023. He is one of the wealthiest Czech citizens and the founder of KKCG. He is the owner of the KKCG Group, which he founded in 1995. KKCG's business activities comprise lotteries and gambling, oil and natural gas, information technologies, and real estate. Its member companies include KKCG Real Estate Group, Allwyn, MND, ARICOMA Group, Springtide Ventures venture capital fund, and others.

Early life
Komárek was born in Hodonín, Czech Republic on 15 March 1969. He started his first business immediately after completing his studies, gradually building one of the most prominent Czech family firms.

KKCG
In 1995 Komárek founded KKCG. KKCG's business activities comprise lotteries and gambling, oil and natural gas, information technologies, and investments. As of 2019, KKCG operated in 18 countries around the world. Its member companies included the SAZKA Group, Moravské naftové doly, ARICOMA Group, Springtide Ventures venture capital fund, and others. As of 2022, KKCG operated in 33 countries.

In 2012, KKCG became the sole owner of the largest Czech lottery company Sazka, which later served as the cornerstone for the establishment of Europe's gambling conglomerate, the SAZKA Group. SAZKA Group holds stakes in Casinos Austria and OPAP (Greece), and takes part in the licensed operations of the biggest Italian lottery company, Lotto. In 2021, SAZKA Group's mother company, SAZKA Entertainment, rebranded to Allwyn. Several months later, in March 2022, Allwyn was selected by the UK Gambling Commission as the Preferred Applicant for the Fourth UK National Lottery Licence. In September 2022, Allwyn was formally awarded the Fourth National Lottery licence. Allwyn and Camelot subsequently worked together to make the transition period smoother, so Allwyn and the Ontario Teachers' Pension Plan agreed on the sale of Camelot UK to Allwyn in November 2022.

KKCG has made investments in information technologies, including the acquisition of majority stakes in AUTOCONT in 2017 and Cleverlance in 2019, two largest companies of its ARICOMA Group. In 2020-2021, it acquired the companies Seavus and Stratiteq. ARICOMA Group currently consists of ten companies. The most recent company to join the group was Musala Soft, which joined in 2022.

KKCG is also active on the real estate market. It has completed various "top rezidence" residential projects in Prague. In June 2021, it finished the Bořislavka Office and Shopping Center in the Prague 6 district.

Wealth
In 2018, Bloomberg estimated Komárek's worth at $3.3 billion dollars. In 2019, Forbes ranked Komárek in 715th place among the world's billionaires with estimated worth of $3 billion dollars; in 2022, Forbes ranked him in 502nd place with estimated worth of $5.3 billion dollars. Bloomberg values his net worth at 8.18 billion USD as of February 2023.

Philanthropy
In 2008, Komárek co-founded the Dvořák Prague International Music Festival. In 2020, his family foundation KKFF purchased 11 pianos worth 200,000 euros from the Czech manufacturer Petrof to be donated to Czech schools.

Komárek has received the Gold Medal in the Arts from the Kennedy Center International Committee on the Arts for his achievements in the field of art.

Personal life
He is married to Štěpánka. He has four children, and homes in the Czech Republic and Verbier, Switzerland.

References

1969 births
People from Hodonín
Czech businesspeople
Living people
Czech billionaires